Jordanian nationality law is the law governing the acquisition, transmission and loss of Jordanian citizenship. Jordanian citizenship is the status of being a citizen of the Hashemite Kingdom of Jordan and it can be obtained by birth, marriage or naturalization. 

Jordanian nationality is governed by Law No 6 of 1954 on Nationality, also known as the Jordanian Nationality Law, 1954, which was last amended in 1987. The law is administered by the Civil Status and Passports Department (CSPD), which is part of the Ministry of Interior. 

Without Jordanian citizenship, residents may have difficulty obtaining a driver’s licence and benefits from certain government services, such as free healthcare and education, as well as being able to obtain work permits, own property and invest in Jordan.

Rights and responsibilities of Jordanian citizens

Rights of citizens
Jordanian citizens have the legal right to:

 a Jordanian passport.
 live freely in Jordan without any immigration requirements.
 gain access to free education covering primary, and secondary education. University education is not free.
 receive all health-care benefits at any public health institution.
 participate in the Jordanian political system.
 benefit from the privileges of the free trade market agreements between Jordan and many Arab countries.
 get exempted from taxes with no condition of reciprocity.
 own and inherit property and values in Jordan.
 enter to and exit from Jordan through any port.
 travel to and from other countries in accordance with visa requirements.
 seek consular assistance and protection abroad through Jordanian embassies and consulates abroad and others.

Responsibilities of citizens
In a state of necessity, all Jordanian citizens are required, when prescribed by the law of the Jordanian government, to bear arms on behalf of Jordan, to perform noncombatant service in the Jordanian Armed Forces, and to perform work of national importance under civilian direction.

Under the supervision of an official authority, a person convicted by a court of law may be required to do any work or to render any service provided that the person is not hired to or placed at the disposal of any persons, companies, societies or public bodies.

Nationality at birth
Jordanian nationality is determined predominantly by paternity (father) (see Jus sanguinis). The place of birth is irrelevant, and being born in Jordan does not grant a right to Jordanian nationality. That is, in most cases, individuals are deemed to be Jordanian nationals regardless of whether they are born inside or outside Jordan as long as their father holds Jordanian nationality.

Children born legitimately to a non-citizen father are deemed to have acquired the nationality of their father. This may result in cases where children born to legitimate Palestinian fathers, for instance, may be rendered stateless.

Restricted maternal transmission of Jordanian citizenship may only occur if the Jordanian mother is not married, or the father is of unknown nationality or is stateless.

Under the current law, children of a Jordanian woman and a foreign father are not entitled to Jordanian citizenship. Since 2010, there has been an increasing public demand for giving the opportunity for Jordanian women to transmit Jordanian nationality to their children.

Nationality by marriage
A foreign woman who marries a Jordanian national can apply to acquire Jordanian citizenship:

 after three years of her marriage if she is an Arab,
 after five years of her marriage if she is not an Arab. 

A Jordanian woman who marries a non-Jordanian and acquires the nationality of her husband may retain her Jordanian nationality unless she renounces it. 

A foreign man married to a Jordanian national does not acquire Jordanian citizenship by virtue of being married to a Jordanian national. 

Since 2010, there has been an increasing public demand for giving the opportunity for Jordanian women to be able to transmit Jordanian nationality to their husbands.

Naturalization
Article 4: 
Any Arab who has resided continuously in Jordan for not less than 15 years may acquire Jordanian nationality if he renounces his nationality of origin and the law of his country permits him to do so, provided that:

 he is of good conduct and has never been convicted of an offence involving his honour or morals;
 he has lawful means of livelihood;
 he is of sound mind and does not suffer from any impairment that would make him a burden on society;
 he takes an oath of allegiance and loyalty to his Majesty before a justice of the peace.

Article 12:
Any person other than a Jordanian who is not incapable by law may apply to the Council of Ministers for grant of a certificate of Jordanian naturalization if:

 he has been regularly resident in Jordan for a period of four years preceding the date of his application;
 he intends to reside in Jordan.

Dual nationality
According to the Jordanian government, there has not been any restrictions on multiple citizenship in Jordan since 1954. Thus, foreigners who acquire Jordanian citizenship and Jordanian citizens who voluntarily acquire another citizenship keep their previous citizenship (subject to the laws of the other country).

Loss of Jordanian citizenship
A Jordanian does not lose Jordanian citizenship nor acquire the nationality of another country without the consent of the Board of Ministers, unless that other country is an Arab state.

Renunciation
Jordanian law permits voluntary renunciation of Jordanian citizenship, with the permission of the Board of Ministers. Someone wishing to renounce his/her citizenship must contact the Jordanian consular or diplomatic officer or a Jordanian embassy in a foreign country and pay the required fee and further be approved by the Ministry of Interior.

Loss due to cessation of paternity
A child whose Jordanian citizenship depends on paternal links loses citizenship when those are cut.

Adoption
A Jordanian child adopted by foreign parents is considered to have lost Jordanian citizenship.

Where a former Jordanian citizen lost citizenship due to adoption by foreign parents and that adoption is later annulled, the Jordanian citizenship is considered to never have been lost.

Dual citizenship
Even though Jordanian nationality law permits multiple citizenship, a Jordanian national who also holds another country's citizenship may be required to renounce the foreign citizenship, under the foreign country's nationality law. A dual Jordanian-Japanese national must, for example, make a declaration of choice, to the Japanese Ministry of Justice, before turning 22, as to whether he or she wants to keep the Jordanian or Japanese citizenship.

Loss due to misconduct
A person who undermines the security of Jordan may be stripped of his citizenship and in some cases his family may lose it as well.

Loss due to foreign defense registration
A person who joins the armed forces of another country will lose his/her Jordanian citizenship.

Status of children of Jordanian women married to foreigners
Since 2010, there has been an increasing public demand for Jordanian women to have the ability to transmit Jordanian nationality to their children and also to their husbands. In recent years, growing domestic pressures and foreign concerns have demanded the Jordanian government grant civil rights to the children of Jordanian women married to foreigners, including the right to receive treatment in hospitals affiliated with the Ministry of Health, the right to obtain residency permits and the right to education in public schools and universities. This is in addition to their right to work, obtain driver’s licenses and perhaps grant them ordinary passports (without a national number) to facilitate their travel outside the country.

On 7 September 2014, amidst growing public outcry and pressures from foreign leaders such as the United States Secretary of State John Kerry, Jordanian Prime Minister Abdullah Ensour announced the government's approval to grant children of Jordanian women married to foreigners certain privileges and facilities to ease their lives within Jordan.

As of January 2015, there were 88,983 Jordanian women married to non-Jordanians and these families had 355,932 children registered with the CSPD. The regulations were issued on 4 January 2015 and, by the end of the month, the Civil Status and Passports Department (CSPD) had received 9,741 applications to issue special identification cards for children of Jordanian women married to foreigners. Marwan Qteishat, director of the CSPD, told The Jordan Times near the end of January 2015 that they had issued 965 identification cards and processed 2,148 applications.

Revocation of citizenship from Jordanian citizens of Palestinian origin
Many Palestine refugees obtained Jordanian nationality on the basis of Law No 6 of 1954 on Nationality which classifies as Jordanian nationals “any person who, not being Jewish, possessed Palestinian nationality before 15 May 1948 and was a regular resident in [Jordan] between 20 December 1949 and 16 February 1954”.

Jordan relinquished its claim to the West Bank in 1988, after which and especially in the 2000s, the Jordanian government has been arbitrarily and without notice withdrawing Jordanian nationality from Jordanian citizens of Palestinian origin, making them stateless. As Human Rights Watch has stated, this is in direct violation of Jordan's nationality law, which provides that non-Jewish Palestinian residents in 1949 or thereafter received full Jordanian nationality following Jordan's incorporation of the West Bank in April 1950.

Palestinians who moved from the West Bank (whether refugees or not) to Jordan, are issued yellow-ID cards to distinguish them from the Palestinians of the "official 10 refugee camps" in Jordan. From 1988 to 2012, thousands of those yellow-ID card Palestinians had their Jordanian citizenship revoked. Jordan's Interior Minister Nayef al-Kadi said: 

"Our goal is to prevent Israel from emptying the Palestinian territories of their original inhabitants," the minister explained, confirming that the kingdom had begun revoking the citizenship of Palestinians.

"We should be thanked for taking this measure," he said. "We are fulfilling our national duty because Israel wants to expel the Palestinians from their homeland."Demonizing Israel is bad for the Palestinians, by Mudar Zarhan, 01/08/2010, Jerusalem Post

Human Rights Watch estimated that about 2,700 Palestinians were stripped of Jordanian nationality between 2004 and 2008. It is estimated that over 40,000 Palestinians were affected by this policy.

The Jordanian government has said that these actions are akin to those of other Arab nations with the intention of helping Jordanians of Palestinian descent by requiring those who fled the West Bank or Jerusalem after the war in 1967 to keep their Israeli documents valid since the Israeli government continues to shift further right-wing under the leadership of its conservative foreign minister Avigdor Lieberman. Nabil Sharif, the former minister of state for media affairs and Jordanian ambassador to Morocco, said: 

In 2012, the Jordanian government promised to stop revoking the citizenship of Palestinians, and restored citizenship to 4,500 Palestinians who had previously lost it.

However, many have criticized the actions of the Jordanian government as an underhanded move to preserve the government's own interest by trying to appease non-Palestinian Jordanians concerned about the growing economic and political influence of citizens of Palestinian descent, which Nabil Sharif had denied.

See also

Constitution of Jordan
Driving licence in Jordan
Foreign relations of Jordan
History of Jordan
Jordanian diaspora
Jordanian identity card
Jordanian passport
Politics of Jordan
Vehicle registration plates of Jordan
Visa policy of Jordan
Visa requirements for Jordanian citizens

References

External links
 Law No. 6 of 1954 on Jordanian Nationality

Nationality law
Law of Jordan
Politics of Jordan
Government of Jordan
Human rights in Jordan